Patra Harapan Rindorindo (born 2 March 2004) is an Indonesian badminton player. He was a silver medalist at the World Junior Championships boys' doubles event in Santander, Spain.

Achievements

World Junior Championships 
Boys' doubles

BWF International Challenge/Series (1 title, 2 runners-up) 
Men's doubles

  BWF International Challenge tournament
  BWF International Series tournament
  BWF Future Series tournament

BWF Junior International (3 titles) 
Boys' doubles

Mixed doubles

  BWF Junior International Grand Prix tournament
  BWF Junior International Challenge tournament
  BWF Junior International Series tournament
  BWF Junior Future Series tournament

Performance timeline

Individual competitions

Junior level 
 Boys' doubles

Senior level 
 Men's doubles

References

External links 
 

2004 births
Living people
People from Klaten Regency
Indonesian male badminton players
21st-century Indonesian people